HMY Victoria and Albert was a royal yacht of the Royal Navy of the United Kingdom. The yacht was designed by the Chief Constructor of the Royal Navy Sir William White, launched in 1899 and ready for service in 1901. This was the third yacht to be named Victoria and Albert and she was fitted with steam engines fired by Belleville water-tube boilers. She served four sovereigns, and was decommissioned as royal yacht in 1939, served in the Second World War, and was broken up in 1954.

Background and Construction

Queen Victoria had lobbied Parliament for many years for a more modern yacht –  dated from 1855 – and winning this expenditure after pointing out that both the Russian Tsar and the German Kaiser had larger and more modern yachts than Great Britain.

The yacht was launched at Pembroke Dockyard 9 May 1899 by the Duchess of York. She was completed in the summer 1901, seven months after the death of Queen Victoria. The total cost of the ship was £572,000, five-sevenths the cost of the battleship .

The vessel had an antiquated look when launched as the design was made to resemble the 1855 side wheel steamer Victoria and Albert. Unlike yachts of other monarchs of the time the vessel was purely a yacht, not a combination yacht and warship. The yacht's dimensions were  length,  length between perpendiculars,  beam with a displacement of 5,700 tons and  draft. Belleville water-tube boilers provided steam powering two sets of vertical four cylinder triple expansion engines with combined 11,000 indicated horse power for eight hours and 7,500 indicated horse power on a continuous basis. The boilers were arranged in two watertight compartments one before the other with six boilers in the forward compartment and nine in the aft compartment. The engines were in two side by side watertight compartments. Three dynamo sets provided electric light power. Refrigeration units were placed at the aft end of each engine room.

Three masts were rigged fore and aft with two funnels for the five decked vessel. On the after half of the bridge deck was a  pavilion with an  dining room. A smoking room and reception room were also in the pavilion. An electric hoist was available from the reception room to the royal apartments below, becoming the first ship in the world to be fitted with an elevator.

During fitting-out the yacht had significant extra weight added including concrete ballast and even a large traditional capstan so the Queen could be entertained by watching the sailors work.  This extra weight proved to be beyond the original design parameters and resulted in the ship tipping over when the dock was flooded – causing significant damage to the ship.  Designer Sir William White was exonerated from direct responsibility, but lost confidence and resigned his role as Chief Constructor shortly afterwards.

Operational history

Victoria and Albert was commissioned at Portsmouth 23 July 1901 by Commodore the Hon. Hedworth Lambton, who hoisted his broad pennant. Nearly all the ship's company of 230 men of the old Victoria and Albert were transferred to the new yacht, which with an additional 100 men had a company of 336.

King Edward VII and Queen Alexandra visited their new yacht in early August 1901, and used it for the first time when crossing the English Channel on 9 August 1901 to attend the funeral in Germany of the King's sister, Empress Frederick. She was the base for the royal couple during the fleet review held at Spithead on 16 August 1902 for the coronation of King Edward VII. Following the review, the royal couple toured the West Coast of Scotland and visited the Isle of Man, before the Victoria and Albert took Queen Alexandra to Copenhagen for her annual autumn visit. In late 1902 she was docked for several months to be fitted with telescopic masts.

King Edward later used the yacht for summer cruises most years of his reign, visiting various countries in Europe.

Victoria and Albert later served King George V, King Edward VIII and King George VI, and took part in two fleet reviews (in 1935 and the Coronation Review of the Fleet, 1937), but was withdrawn after the latter and decommissioned in 1939. During 1947, while moored alongside at Whale Island, her caretaker was Mr J.G. "Tom" Cox BEM, RN.

Although there were plans for a new yacht to be built these were suspended due to the outbreak of the Second World War. Eventually HMY Britannia replaced Victoria and Albert in 1954.

References

Bibliography

External links
 
 MaritimeQuest photo gallery: Victoria and Albert
 Video of Victoria and Albert at the opening ceremony of Southampton's King George V dry dock in July 1933

Ships built in Pembroke Dock
Victoria and Albert 3
Steam yachts
1899 ships